The 2022 Mexico City Grand Prix (officially known as the Formula 1 Gran Premio de la Ciudad de México 2022) was a Formula One motor race that was held on 30 October 2022 at the Autódromo Hermanos Rodríguez in Mexico City, Mexico. The race was the 20th round of the 2022 Formula One World Championship and marked the 22nd edition of the Mexican Grand Prix, which was run under the name Mexico City Grand Prix for the second time. It was won by defending champion Max Verstappen, who was followed by Lewis Hamilton in second and Sergio Pérez in third.

Background
The event was held across the weekend of the 28–30 October. It was the twentieth round of the 2022 Formula One World Championship.

Championship standings before the race
Going into the weekend, both the Drivers' and Constructors' titles had already been decided at the Japanese and United States Grands Prix, respectively. Max Verstappen led the Drivers' Championship with 124 points from Charles Leclerc, second, and 126 from teammate Sergio Pérez, third. Red Bull Racing led the Constructors' Championship from Ferrari by 187 points and Mercedes by 240 points.

Entrants

The drivers and teams were the same as the season entry list with no additional stand-in drivers for the race. Pietro Fittipaldi, Logan Sargeant, Liam Lawson and Nyck de Vries drove for Haas in place of Kevin Magnussen, for Williams in place of Alexander Albon, for AlphaTauri in place of Yuki Tsunoda, and for Mercedes in place of George Russell, respectively, during the first practice session. Jack Doohan drove for Alpine in place of Esteban Ocon in the same session, making his Formula One practice debut.

Tyre choices

Tyre supplier Pirelli brought the C2, C3, and C4 tyre compounds (designated hard, medium, and soft, respectively) for teams to use at the event.

Track changes 
The second and the third activation point of the DRS were moved further back, being positioned  after turn 17 and  after turn 3, respectively.

Penalties 
Aston Martin's Lance Stroll carried a three-place grid penalty for causing a collision with Fernando Alonso at the previous round, the United States Grand Prix.

Qualifying

Qualifying classification 

  – Kevin Magnussen received a five-place grid penalty for exceeding his quota of power unit elements.
  – Mick Schumacher and Sebastian Vettel set the identical lap time. Schumacher was classified ahead of Vettel as he set the lap earlier.
  – Lance Stroll received a three-place grid penalty for causing a collision with Fernando Alonso at the previous round.

Race

Race classification 

Notes
  – Includes one point for fastest lap.
  – Daniel Ricciardo received a ten-second time penalty for causing a collision with Yuki Tsunoda. His final position was not affected by the penalty.
  – Fernando Alonso was classified as he completed more than 90% of the race distance.

Championship standings after the race

Drivers' Championship standings

Constructors' Championship standings

 Note: Only the top five positions are included for both sets of standings.
 Competitors in bold and marked with an asterisk are the 2022 world champions.

References

External links

Mexico City
2022
Mexico City Grand Prix
Mexico City Grand Prix